Charriol is a Swiss manufacturer of luxury watches and jewellery founded in 1983 by  French entrepreneur, Philippe Charriol.

Today, this Geneva-based international luxury brand specializes in watches, jewelry, leather goods, writing instruments, travelware, eyewear and fragrances. It is currently distributed through a global network of 3,800 retailers, 500 Corners, and 340 mono-brand Boutiques, including a network of 285 Charriol Boutiques in China.

Philippe Charriol, a devotee of art and history, drew inspiration from ancient Celtic culture in order to create his maiden collection in 1983 - the Celtic Collection. He was the first jeweler to use gold cable, or steel cable, as decorative motifs and as watch bracelets. This concept is patented by CHARRIOL and the brand holds exclusive worldwide rights over it. This cable material is the key element of the brand’s Jewelry collections and is featured on all accessories of the brand.

The watch portfolio consists of several lines featuring 18kt gold or steel models. These are the Actor, Alexandre, Celtic, Colvmbvs, Rotonde by Charriol, Saint Tropez, and Parisii.

Over the last 32 years the brand has sold over 1,450,000 watches, 2,650,000 pieces of jewelry; 600,000 handbags, 550,000 belts and more than a half-million writing instruments.

History

Charriol was founded in 1983, when Philippe Charriol decided to launch the company all across the Americas, Asia, and Europe.
1983 - Philippe Charriol launches his own "Philippe Charriol" brand. Inspried by Celtic torcs, he creates the signature cable watch, also known as Celtic.

1984 - The first Celtic jewellery was created in vermeil. Additionally, the Celtic belt was created.

1985 - The Alexandre watch was created.
Swiss and Hong Kong companies had been founded.

1988 - The Christopher Columbus watch was invented.

1989: The St-Tropez line of watches, the Celtic Ballpen, and the first Châteaux de France bags and small leather goods.

1990: Extra large Celtic and automatic Yucatán watches were launched.
In the same year, the first boutiques opened in Hong Kong and Singapore, taking up the "Colums" boutique concept.

1992: A wider boutique network with 10 more openings in Asia and the Middle East, plus corners in the USA.
In 1992, the Philippe Charriol Group was operating in nearly 60 countries.

1993: New lines were launched: new Celtic watches, new Celtic Fountain Pens and Roller pens, Celtic bags and glasses.

1994: First step of the brand in the no cable world.

1995: Upgrading of the Celtic line in the "Haute Horlogerie" with 18kt Celtic "Le Tourbillon" watch.
Enlargement of the Celtic jewelry watches (full paved with 18kt Cascade bracelet, precious stones), and a larger collection of 18kt Celtic Jewelry.
Development of the Automatic Chronograph Venturi and upgrading of the St-Tropez collection with the launching of the round Silver.

1996: The Philippe Charriol Supersport Trophy in car racing gave birth to the SuperSportS Automatic Chronograph.
Opening of the first boutique in China.

1997: Launching of the Colvmbvs Rectangular, St-Tropez 18kt with 18kt bracelet, Silver Celtic Jewelry, Coralys bags and opening of the first boutique in Tokyo.

1998: The no cable part of the collection is extended with the reinforcing of the Colvmbvs line.
Launching of the Diablo Automatic Chronograph (in relation with the Lamborghini Diablo).

1999: Launching of Colvmbvs XL Automatic and quartz, Mini Integral Colvmbvs, Colvmbvs tonneau chronograph quartz, Colvmbvs silver jewelry, Colvmbvs bags and small leather goods.
The new Charriol corporate color becomes prune to replace the dark grey.
In Asia, 5 new branches join the worldwide boutique network.

2000: Launching of Megeve watch and jewelry collection, Colvmbvs XL Chronograph quartz, Celtic Carre watch, Azur watches on cable bracelet, Azur and St-Tropez silver with diamonds.

2001: Megeve 18kt watch, jewelry and ladies pen collection, Coralie 18kt jewelry, new Colvmbvs Round watch collection, Colvmbvs Round Astroblade Millennium limited edition and presentation of the Celtica watch concept.

2002: 20th Anniversary of CHARRIOL brand.

Launching of Bonbons collection from Coralie 18kt Jewelry with colored precious stones, Colvmbvs Round concept 18kt Jewelry collection, gold and steel Colvmbvs rectangle collection, All Colors and All Black Colvmbvs collection, 20th Anniversary "Armilliaire" watch, Celtic black cable jewelry collection, Colvmbvs Lady Jet Set with Cognac diamonds, Megeve watch on colored leather straps.

2003: Launching of Celtic 3, new SuperSportS chrono steel & rubber, Actor's watch collection, St-Tropez All Steel Round, Rectangular and By Night model.

At that time, he was already in Hong Kong making investments on wine. In 1989, he would go on to later open the first Charriol boutique in Geneva, followed by three others in Hong Kong. In 2008, the company celebrated its 25th anniversary.

26 February 2019: Philippe Charriol dies in a tragic racing accident on the Circuit Paul Ricard race track in le Castellet, France.

The Philippe Charriol Foundation
Philippe Charriol's artistic and cultural tastes and his desire to encourage promising painters and sculptors, inspired him to set up the PHILIPPE CHARRIOL Foundation in countries such as Hong Kong, Singapore, Malaysia, Thailand and in preparation, in many other countries.
Every year, a competition is held in these countries to select three winning painters and three winning sculptors, with the top awards entitling the holders to a scholarship to study in Paris.

Sports sponsorship

Motorsports 

Race of Champions: Charriol took part in the Race of Champions held in Beijing China in 2010. Among the best pilots in the world compete, including Michael Schumacher, David Coulthard, Sebastian Vettel, Mikko Hirvonen, and Mattias Ekstrom.
Charriol sponsored Christophe Bouchut in 2005.
Charriol sponsors SBK World Superbike Championship rider Loris Baz.
Official time-keeper of Andros Trophy 2002
Official time-keeper of Lamborghini Supertrophy 2001

Polo 

Polo Masters Tour in St-Tropez, Megève and Le Touquet with Charriol Polo team.

Golf 

Mission Hills Golfathon from 2007 to 2008
Regional golf tournaments in Switzerland

Basketball 

Charriol became official sponsor of the Phoenix Suns from 2007 to 2008.

See also
List of watch manufacturers
List of Swiss companies

References

Watch manufacturing companies of Switzerland
Luxury brands
Manufacturing companies established in 1983
Watch brands
Swiss companies established in 1983